The Barzalosa Formation (Pgb, Pgba) is a fossiliferous geological formation of the Upper Magdalena Valley and the bounding foothills of the Central Ranges and Eastern Ranges of the Colombian Andes. The formation consists of conglomerates, sandstones and siltstones. Fossils of Balanerodus logimus, Lophiodolodus chaparralensis, Xenastrapotherium chaparralensis, Protheosodon sp. and Proadinotherium sp. have been uncovered from the formation in Chaparral, Tolima.

Etymology 
The formation was defined by Scheibe in 1934 and named after Barzalosa, a vereda of Girardot, Cundinamarca. Cáceres and Etayo elevated the "Pisos de Barzalosa" to a formation in 1969.

Description

Lithologies 
The Barzalosa Formation consists of conglomerates, sandstones and siltstones. In parts, the formation contains shale beds and gypsum.

Stratigraphy and depositional environment 
In the east towards Fusagasugá, the formation overlies the La Tabla Formation and is overlain by the Carmen de Apicalá Conglomerate. As the formation does not contain foraminifera, the age is difficult to establish, but has been estimated to be Oligocene to Early Miocene, or Middle Eocene to Oligocene. The depositional environment has been interpreted as alluvial fans and braided rivers.

Fossil content

Outcrops 

The Barzalosa Formation is apart from its type locality found in Tocaima and to the east of Agua de Dios, and on the western side of the Magdalena River around Chaparral, Tolima.

Regional correlations

See also 

  Geology of the Eastern Hills
  Middle Magdalena Valley
  Geology of the Altiplano Cundiboyacense

Notes

References

Bibliography

Maps 
 
 

Geologic formations of Colombia
Paleogene Colombia
Neogene Colombia
Oligocene Series of South America
Miocene Series of South America
Conglomerate formations
Sandstone formations
Siltstone formations
Alluvial deposits
Fluvial deposits
Fossiliferous stratigraphic units of South America
Paleontology in Colombia
Formations
Formations